Christopher Addae is the member of parliament for the constituency. He was elected on the ticket of the New Patriotic Party (NPP) and won a majority of 2227 votes to become the MP. He was also the incumbent MP during the 2008 parliamentary elections of Ghana.

See also
List of Ghana Parliament constituencies

References 

Parliamentary constituencies in the Western North Region